Cummings is an unincorporated community within the Rural Municipality of Maple Creek No. 111, Saskatchewan, Canada. The community is located on Range road 295, 30 km northwest of Maple Creek.

Demographics

Cummings, like so many smaller communities throughout Saskatchewan, has struggled to maintain a sturdy population causing it to become a ghost town.

Education

Cummings no longer has a school, but those who live in or around Cummings are sent to the neighboring town of Maple Creek which has a school that covers Kindergarten to Grade 12 serving approximately 400 students.

See also
 List of communities in Saskatchewan
 Ghost towns in Saskatchewan

References

Maple Creek No. 111, Saskatchewan
Unincorporated communities in Saskatchewan
Ghost towns in Saskatchewan
Division No. 4, Saskatchewan